Living Waters Catholic Regional Division No. 42 or Living Waters Catholic School Division is a separate school authority within the Canadian province of Alberta operated out of Whitecourt.

See also 
List of school authorities in Alberta

References

External links 

 
School districts in Alberta
Whitecourt